Kinwamakwad Lake, also known as Long Lake, is a seepage at the University of Notre Dame Environmental Research Center in Gogebic County, Michigan. The lake has been studied since the mid-1900s and used as an experimental lake for ecological studies.

Description
Kinwamakwad Lake is an hourglass-shaped lake with two deep basins to the East and West and a shallower portion in the middle of the lake. The name "Kinwamakwad" possibly comes from the Ojibwe word ginwaakwad, meaning "it is long, is tall".

Ecological studies
Kinwamakwad Lake has been studied for several decades and is a part of the Global Lake Ecological Observatory Network. The lake has been used in several whole-lake experiments examining the effects of nutrients and food web structure on lake productivity as well as the effects of dissolved organic carbon on lake productivity.

Records
A pair of the unofficial world's largest secchi disks reside in Kinwamakwad Lake, with both disks measuring 2.44 meters in diameter.

References

Lakes of Gogebic County, Michigan
University of Notre Dame
Lakes of Michigan